Christian Brothers College High School (CBC High School) is a Lasallian Catholic college preparatory school for young men in Town and Country, Missouri, a suburb of St. Louis. It is located in the Roman Catholic Archdiocese of Saint Louis and is owned and operated by the De La Salle Christian Brothers Midwest District and is the second oldest Lasallian school in the United States.

History

Early years (1850–1916)
The school was founded in 1850 under the name St. Joseph's Academy by three French-speaking Christian Brothers who had come to St. Louis the previous year from Montreal, Quebec. In 1851, the school moved from its original location at 16th and Market Streets to 8th and Cerre Streets in downtown St. Louis, and the name changed to the "Academy of the Christian Brothers." In December 1855, the school was granted a college charter, becoming the Brothers' first U.S. institution to operate at the collegiate level.

In 1882, due to lack of space, the school moved to the "Cote Brilliante" campus in north St. Louis on the northeast corner of Easton Ave. and N. Kingshighway, where it served as a primary, secondary, and college boarding school for boys. At one point in the 1890s, more than half of St. Louis' clergy were graduates of CBC.

The Summer Olympic Games were held in St. Louis in 1904, the first Olympics to feature a competitive soccer (association football) tournament and to award medals in the sport. Concerns regarding team travel from Europe, and a lack of amateur players of the sport, were addressed when the Cadets of Christian Brothers College (along with the Raiders, a soccer team made up from members of St. Rose Parish Church Athletics Association) were invited to represent the United States in the association football tournament of the 1904 Summer Olympic Games. The only other entrant in the competition were the then-champions of Canada, from Galt, Ontario. The tournament was held in Francis Field in mid-November. The Canadians easily won the gold medal, but Christian Brothers College came second, and each member of the team was awarded a silver medal. Those remain the only Olympic medals awarded to a school or college. The second-place finish remains the best result achieved by a United States men's soccer team at the Olympic Games. The 11 members of the school team included three brothers, John, Thomas, and Charles January, and the youngest of the siblings was just 16 years old at the time. Charles, the last surviving member of the team, died in 1970.

On October 5, 1916, a fire destroyed the school, killing seven firefighters, two sick Brothers, and a nurse. Washington University in St. Louis allowed CBC to use the former Smith Academy building for the rest of the academic year.

Clayton Campus (1922–2003)
For several years, the brothers taught in parochial schools until a new "Christian Brothers College High School" was built at University Lane and Clayton Road in Clayton, Missouri. The school building was opened in 1922 and expanded several times over the following decades to accommodate increasing enrollment.

CBC long hosted an Army JROTC program; students were required to participate. Later, it became a voluntary program, and was disbanded in 1993.

In 1998, the CBC Board of Directors announced the school would move eight miles westward to a new campus in West St. Louis County.

West County Campus (2003–present)
The current campus is located at the northwest corner at the intersection of I-64 and I-270, close to Missouri Baptist University. The first academic year at the new location was 2003–04.  In January 2006, CBC announced plans to begin drug testing all students during the 2007-08 academic year. The school became the first private school in the West St. Louis area to implement such testing, and the proposal received widespread press coverage.

Athletics

School mascot
The mascot from the inception of inter-collegiate athletics at CBC until 1916 was the Collegians. The team was known as the Hi-Pointers during the early years on Clayton Road through the 1950s; the name derives from the Hi-Pointe neighborhood in Clayton where CBC was located from 1922 to 2003. The team was unofficially renamed the Cadets after the students when CBC began mandatory JROTC training in the 1930s. The name became official in 1958 and the Cadets logo was created in 1993 by Jason Buford (class of 1994).

Athletic grounds
Klemm Field at W. Michael Ross '66 Stadium
Prominently viewed off of I-64 on the Town and Country campus is W. Michael Ross Stadium, a 3,000 seat Multi-Purpose stadium hosting Football, Soccer, Lacrosse and Ultimate. Carved into the southern hill of the campus, Ross Stadium is known for its dusk time shadows and sun rays during early season football games. It also prominently features a rock "CBC" on the grandstand hillside, similar to the University of Missouri "M". Klemm Field in 2012 became a "Championship Field". The turf that was used to replace the original surface is from the Mercedes-Benz Superdome and hosted the BCS National Championship and several Bowl Games.

Cadet Park

CBC's practice fields are called "Cadet Park"; it has enough room for about 2 football fields. CBC's tennis courts are also here.

Mike Shannon Stadium at Cadet Park

Mike Shannon Stadium is CBC's baseball stadium. The team began playing games there for 2013. Before, the project began CBC's varsity team played at Missouri Baptist University.

Metro Catholic Conference
CBC is a chartered member of the Metro Catholic Conference (MCC). The MCC, sometimes known as "The Big 5," was formed in 1992 and includes Chaminade College Preparatory School, De Smet Jesuit High School, St. John Vianney High School, and SLUH.

Championships
National collegiate championships

Soccer: 1890, 1891, 1892, 1893, 1894, 1895, 1896, 1897, 1898, 1899, 1900, 1901, 1902, 1903, 1904, 1905
Team state championships
Baseball: 2010, 2015
Basketball: 1933, 1959, 1960, 1963, 1997, 2014, 2022
Football: 2014, 2017, 2018, 2021
Ice Hockey: 1983, 1987, 1988, 1993, 2001, 2003, 2004, 2005, 2007, 2008, 2009, 2012, 2014, 2015, 2016, 2017, 2021
Soccer: 1969, 1983, 1984, 1988, 2004, 2005, 2009, 2012, 2016, 2018
Inline Hockey: 2001, 2004, 2005, 2011, 2016
Lacrosse: 2007, 2013
Track and Field: 1935, 1941
Indoor Track and Field: 1940
Racquetball: 2007
Wrestling: 2018, 2019
Bowling: 2004 
Cross Country: One individual state championship (1998)
Wrestling: Nine individual state champions most recently 2018 at 113, 126, 132, 182

The CBC Hockey team won 130 straight games from 2002–03 to the 2006 season final.

CBC Football has had 3 consecutive undefeated seasons in 1961, 1962 and 1963, before the state title in Missouri was established.

Collegiate Level

 Football: 1900 (Missouri State)
 Soccer: 1901 (USA National Champions), 1901 (Canadian National Champions)

1904 Summer Olympic Games
Association Football (Soccer): Silver Medal (Best appearance by U.S. men's soccer team in Olympic history)

Performing arts 
The Cerre Players, headed by Thomas Murray and Ed Goetz, are noted for performance- plays and musicals that have included High School Musical On Stage!, A Few Good Men, Urinetown, Les Miserables, Footloose, Jesus Christ Superstar, Beauty and the Beast, Crazy for You, How to Succeed in Business Without Really Trying, Oklahoma!, and Sweeney Todd. Murray completed his 100th production at CBC with Little Shop of Horrors.
The new theatre, Gundaker Theater, opened in 2003 when CBC moved to the West County campus.

The CBC Music Program, informally called the "Band of Brothers", primarily plays jazz and rock-style music. The choral groups include "The Cadet Chorus" and the premier group "Brothers in Harmony". The CBC Drum-line is noted for novelty cadences like "Canosaurus" and "High Voltage". The Band of Brothers, Brothers in Harmony, and the Drum-line are CBC's primary performing and touring groups. CBC also offers classes in Piano, Guitar, Music Practicum and a Beginning Band.

Notable alumni

Arts
King Baggot, star of the silent film era
Mike Peters, Pulitzer Prize-winning editorial cartoonist for the Dayton Daily News and author of the popular comic strip Mother Goose and Grimm

Politics
Jack Buechner, congressman and former state legislator
Michael Burton, member of the Missouri House of Representatives and former actor
Joseph M. Darst, former mayor of St. Louis (1949–1953)
William L. Ewing, mayor of St. Louis (1881–1885)
Harold A. Moise, member of the Louisiana Supreme Court (1948 to 1958)

Athletics
1904 Olympic soccer medalists: Charles Bartliff, Warren Brittingham, Oscar Brockmeyer, Alexander Cudmore, Charles January, John January, Thomas January, Raymond Lawler, Louis Menges, Peter Ratican
Jake Burger, baseball player for Chicago White Sox
Herb Donaldson, former NFL player
Culver Hastedt, runner and two-time gold medalist at the 1904 Summer Olympics; also won numerous "Open" Olympic events in 1904 representing CBC and the Missouri Athletic Club
Joseph Lydon, boxer and bronze medalist at the 1904 Summer Olympics; also played for the CBC soccer team that won the silver medal
John Kelly, amateur golfer, runner-up in the 2006 U.S. Amateur (Golf) Championship
Larry Hughes, NBA shooting guard with Philadelphia 76ers, Golden State Warriors, Washington Wizards, Cleveland Cavaliers, Chicago Bulls, New York Knicks, Charlotte Bobcats, and Orlando Magic
Patrick McCaw, NBA player with Toronto Raptors
Philip McRae, NHL player with St. Louis Blues
Hughie Miller, baseball player
Don Mueller, MLB player with New York Giants, Chicago White Sox, 2-time All-Star
Jeff Otis, former NFL quarterback
Mike Shannon, Major League Baseball player for St. Louis Cardinals and sports broadcaster
Harry Swacina, Major League Baseball player for Pittsburgh Pirates and Baltimore Terrapins
Joe Vitale, retired NHL player and current radio color analyst for the St. Louis Blues.
Armon Watts, NFL defensive tackle
Caleb Love, UNC basketball player

Professional soccer
Brandon Barklage, professional soccer player with New York Red Bulls
Zach Bauer, professional soccer player with AC St. Louis
Daryl Doran, indoor soccer player, jersey retired by St. Louis Steamers in 2006
Don Droege, professional soccer player
Jimmy Dunn, soccer player and National Soccer Hall of Fame inductee
Mike Freitag, professional soccer player and college coach
Carl Gentile, professional soccer player
Tommy Heinemann, professional soccer player with Vancouver Whitecaps FC
Tom Howe, professional soccer player
Harry Ratican, soccer player and National Soccer Hall of Fame inductee
Jimmy Roe, soccer player and National Soccer Hall of Fame inductee
Mark Santel, professional soccer player
AJ Cochran, Professional soccer player, MLS & USL

Other
Martin Stanislaus Brennan, American Roman Catholic priest and scientist
Thomas Licavoli, former gangster/bootlegger
Mark Hertling, U.S. Army lieutenant general
Martin Kilcoyne, sportscaster
Benedict T. Viviano, New Testament scholar and author
Harold A. Moise, associate justice of the Louisiana Supreme Court, 1948–1958.
Mark Santel, professional soccer player
Owen Shroyer, political activist

References

External links
Official website

Roman Catholic Archdiocese of St. Louis
Lasallian schools in the United States
Educational institutions established in 1850
Roman Catholic secondary schools in St. Louis County, Missouri
Boys' schools in the United States
1850 establishments in Missouri
Buildings and structures in St. Louis County, Missouri